The River Morar is a river that flows from Loch Morar in the west Highlands of Scotland. It flows from the western end of the loch to the estuary of Morar Bay, an inlet of the Sound of Sleat. At less than 1 km in length (at high tide), the River Morar is one of the shortest rivers in Scotland.

The river is crossed by three bridges: one carrying the A830 trunk road, an older bridge for the B8008 road, and one for the West Highland Line railway. The railway viaduct dates from 1897, and is a Category B listed building.

The River Morar is the boundary between the parishes of Glenelg (to the north) and Arisaig and Moidart (to the south).

Falls of Morar
As the River Morar crosses over the rock bar at the end of the loch it forms a series of waterfalls known as the Falls of Morar.

Hydroelectric power station

References

Morar